Martin Gálik is a Slovak professional ice hockey player who played with HC Slovan Bratislava in the Slovak Extraliga.

Career statistics

References

Living people
1979 births
Fehérvár AV19 players
Greensboro Generals players
HC Karlovy Vary players
HC Slovan Bratislava players
HK Levice players
HK Nitra players
HKM Zvolen players
MHC Martin players
MsHK Žilina players
Pee Dee Pride players
Piráti Chomutov players
Sault Ste. Marie Greyhounds players
ŠHK 37 Piešťany players
Slovak ice hockey left wingers
Ice hockey people from Bratislava
Slovak expatriate ice hockey players in Canada
Slovak expatriate ice hockey players in the Czech Republic
Slovak expatriate ice hockey players in the United States
Slovak expatriate sportspeople in Hungary
Expatriate ice hockey players in Hungary